Dehmolla Rural District is a rural district (dehestan) in the Central District of Shahrud County, Semnan Province, Iran. At the 2006 census, its population was 2,197, in 669 families.  The rural district has 8 villages.

References 

Rural Districts of Semnan Province
Shahrud County